The Mendoza River is a river in the province of Mendoza, Argentina. It is formed in the Andes range between the Aconcagua and the Tupungato, by the confluence of the Vacas, the Cuevas and the Tupungato rivers, the last being its major tributary.

Course 
The river reaches Uspallata, then crosses the Precordillera through the Potrerillos Valley, flows along the Cacheuta Canyon and reaches the plain. It forms an arc and turns northeast, finally emptying into the Bañados de Guanacache, which join the San Juan River, part of the system of the Desaguadero River.

In Potrerillos the river is also dammed, forming a reservoir, which feeds a hydroelectric power station.

The Cacheuta Spa and the Potrerillos Dam are tourist destinations along the river.

Mendoza River irrigates the Maipú and Lujan vineyards, located in Mendoza piedmont, at 30° south latitude. This region hosts 17 percent of the Mendoza vineyards, and about 360 wineries.

Location

References

Rivers of Argentina
M